Park Cho-a (born March 6, 1990), known mononymously as Choa, is a South Korean singer. She is best known as a former member of the girl group AOA.

Early life 
Choa was born on March 6, 1990, in Incheon, South Korea. She wanted to major in music at university but her conservative father wanted her to get a traditional job, so she enrolled in Aviation Business Administration in Inha Technical College. She also worked as an IPTV salesperson, where she secretly auditioned to be an idol, failing the audition at SM Entertainment 15 times.

Choa's first step in becoming an idol was when she met singer-songwriter Juniel, who told her about FNC's auditions for their girl group, AOA. Both Juniel and Choa were previously trainees at a company that went bankrupt.

Career

20122013: Debut with AOA

On July 30, 2012, Choa made her debut as a member of AOA on Mnet's M Countdown with the song "Elvis" from their debut single album, Angels' Story.

On June 12, 2013, it was announced that Choa would play the female lead, Gabriella, in the musical High School Musical. Her agency, FNC Entertainment, revealed photos of Choa practising the duet song, "Start of Something New". Choa said that she wanted to portray Gabriella as sincerely as she could. The musical ran from July 2 to September 1 at Seoul's Blue Square Samsung Card Hall.

20142017: Solo activities and hiatus
On March 16, 2014, Choa released a solo OST for TV Chosun's TV series Bride of the Century.

Choa appeared as a new cast member on MBC's variety show "My Little Television". She later left the show on May 19, 2015.

Choa also became a new model for sports brand NBA's 2015 S/S, the first few pictures released were colourful and sporty.

On March 25, 2015, it was revealed that Choa would be one of the members on the studio panel for MBC's We Got Married, replacing Hong Jin-young.

On June 6, 2015, she became an advertising model for Alba Heaven, a website to help people find part-time jobs. She appeared alongside Yoo Byung-jae in a commercial for the website that month.

On July 22, 2015, it was revealed that Choa would collaborate with Primary and Iron for Primary's new single 2-3s song "Don't Be Shy".
The song and the full music video starring Choa was released on July 24, 2015.

A teaser trailer for Choa's solo debut, "Flame", was released on December 14, 2015. "Flame" is a cover of a song by Jang Hye-jin featuring Gary, with Gary's rap reworked into a section for Choa to sing. The song was later released on December 17, 2015.

In October 2016, Choa was confirmed to be the MC of JTBC new variety show Sing For You, scheduled for December 3, 2016.

On June 22, 2017, Choa announced that she would be leaving AOA due to depression and insomnia. She stated that she had tried using medication to help, however, there was no improvement in her mental health. This followed after Choa had a hiatus from the group following their activities from January 2017 when they released their first studio album Angel's Knock. Her departure from AOA was officially confirmed by FNC Entertainment on June 30, 2017. In May 2019, her contract with FNC expired and was not renewed.

2020present: Return and Great M
After a three-year hiatus from the entertainment industry, it was announced on August 6, 2020, that Choa had recorded a new song for the soundtrack of the KBS2 drama Men Are Men. Officials confirmed her participation after viewers heard the song on the August 3 broadcast of the show, and speculated that the singer sounded similar to Choa. According to an entertainment industry official on August 21, 2020, Choa has moved to Great M Entertainment, a new agency founded by Kim Young-sun, who was a founding member and managing director of FNC Entertainment.

In March 2022, it was announced that Choa was preparing to release a single titled "Yesterday" on April 9, 2022.

Discography

Singles

Soundtrack appearances

Filmography

Television shows

Web shows

Awards and nominations

Notes

References

External links 
 

AOA (group) members
1990 births
Living people
K-pop singers
South Korean female idols
South Korean women pop singers
Musicians from Incheon
FNC Entertainment artists
South Korean female models
South Korean television personalities
South Korean dance musicians
South Korean musical theatre actresses
Japanese-language singers of South Korea
South Korean rhythm and blues singers
21st-century South Korean actresses
21st-century South Korean women singers